F-11,461 is a drug that acts as an agonist of the 5-HT1A receptor (Ki = 1.36 nM) that has been used as a radioligand in PET studies. It possesses modest affinity for the 5-HT7 (Ki = 9.1 nM) and D4 (Ki = 8.5 nM) receptors, although the interaction of F-11,461 with these receptors is not detectable with PET due to their relative scarcity in the brain.

See also 
 Befiradol
 8-OH-DPAT

References 

Serotonin receptor agonists
PET radiotracers
Naphthalenes
Piperazines
Triazines
Methoxy compounds